The Metropolitan School of Professional Studies is one of the twelve schools at The Catholic University of America, located in Washington, D.C. The school offers accelerated, online, and evening courses for working adults. The school is part of the main campus in the Brookland neighborhood in Northeast D.C.

History
The Metropolitan School of Professional Studies was established in 1979 to extend the educational resources and programs of the university to adult students wanting to pursue academic and professional credentials.

The school works closely with other organizations in the Washington, D.C. area and worldwide, through partnerships with such organizations as Brothers of Charity, Catholic Charities, and Providence Hospital.

The school also holds an on-site program at the U.S. Department of Veterans Affairs.

Programs of study

Undergraduate programs
Bachelor of Arts in Interdisciplinary Studies
Bachelor of Arts in Management
Bachelor of Arts in Information Technology
Certificate in Business Management
Certificate in Human Resource Management
Certificate in Human Services Administration
Certificate in Information Technology

Graduate programs
Master of Arts in Human Resource Management
Master of Science in Management

References

External links
Official website

Adult education in the United States
Colleges and schools of the Catholic University of America